Ebuskun served as regent for the Central Asian Mongol Empire from 1242 until 1246 during the minority of her son Qara Hülëgü. 

She was the spouse of Mütügen, eldest son of Jagatai and grandson of Jenghiz Khan. She became a widow in 1221. 

When her father-in-law Jagatai died in 1242, her son inherited the throne. Since he was a minor, she became his regent. 

She lost power when the new grand khan Güyük Khan replaced her son Qara Hülëgü with Möngke Khan.

References
 

Chagatai khans
13th-century women rulers